Jalpaiguri Government Medical College and Hospital, established in 2022, is a full-fledged tertiary referral Government Medical college. It is located at Jalpaiguri town of West Bengal. The college imparts the degree of Bachelor of Medicine and Surgery (MBBS). The hospital associated with the college is one of the largest hospitals in the Jalpaiguri district. The yearly undergraduate student intake is 100 from the year 2022.

Courses
Jalpaiguri Medical College and Hospital undertakes education and training of 100 students MBBS courses.

Affiliations
The college is affiliated with West Bengal University of Health Sciences and is recognized by the National Medical Commission.

References

External links 
 http://jalpaigurimedicalcollege.com/about-us/

Medical colleges in West Bengal
Universities and colleges in Jalpaiguri district
Affiliates of West Bengal University of Health Sciences
Educational institutions established in 2022